This is a list of ski areas and resorts in the United States that are currently operational. It is restricted to lift-served alpine ski areas, both public and private.

According to the National Ski Areas Association, 37 U.S. states have operating ski areas with a total 470 nationwide .

New England (90)

Connecticut

 Mohawk Mountain Ski Area — Cornwall
 Mount Southington — Plantsville
 Powder Ridge Ski Area — Middlefield
 Ski Sundown — New Hartford

Maine

 Baker Mountain — Bingham
 Big Rock — Mars Hill
 Big Squaw — Greenville
 Black Mountain of Maine — Rumford
 Camden Snow Bowl — Camden
 Eaton Mountain — Skowhegan
 Hermon Mountain — Hermon
 Lonesome Pine Trails — Fort Kent
 Lost Valley — Auburn
 Mount Abram — Greenwood
 Mount Jefferson Ski Area — Lee
 Pinnacle Ski Club — Pittsfield
 Pleasant Mountain — Bridgton
 Powderhouse Hill — South Berwick
 Quoggy Jo — Presque Isle
 Saddleback Maine — Rangeley
 Sugarloaf — Carrabassett Valley
 Sunday River — Newry
 Titcomb Mountain — Farmington

Massachusetts

 Berkshire East Ski Resort — Charlemont
 Blue Hills Ski Area — Canton
 Bousquet Ski Area — Pittsfield
 Butternut — Great Barrington
 Easton Ski Area at Eaglebrook School (private) 
 Jiminy Peak — Hancock
 Mount Greylock Ski Club — Williamstown (private)
 Nashoba Valley Ski Area — Westford
 Otis Ridge — Otis
 Ski Bradford — Haverhill
 Ski Ward — Shrewsbury
 Wachusett Mountain — Princeton

New Hampshire

 Abenaki Ski Area — Wolfeboro
 Arrowhead — Claremont
 Attitash — Bartlett
 Black Mountain — Jackson
 Bretton Woods — Bretton Woods
 Cannon Mountain — Franconia Notch
 Campton Mountain — Waterville
 Cranmore Mountain Resort — North Conway
 Crotched Mountain — Bennington
 Dartmouth Skiway — Lyme
 Franklin Veterans Memorial Recreation Area — Franklin
 Granite Gorge — Keene
 Gunstock Mountain Resort — Gilford
 Kanc Rec Area — Lincoln
 King Pine — East Madison
 Loon Mountain — Lincoln
 McIntyre Ski Area — Manchester
 Mount Eustis - Littleton
 Mount Prospect — Lancaster
 Mount Sunapee Resort — Sunapee
 Pats Peak — Henniker
 Ragged Mountain — Danbury
 Red Hill Ski Club — Moultonborough
 Storrs Hill — Lebanon
 Tenney Mountain Ski Resort — Plymouth
 The Balsams Wilderness — Dixville Notch (temporarily closed)
 Waterville Valley Resort — Waterville Valley
 Whaleback — Enfield
 Wildcat Mountain — Pinkham Notch

Rhode Island

 Yawgoo Valley — Exeter

Vermont

 Ascutney Outdoors - Brownsville
 Bellows Falls Ski Tow — Bellows Falls
 Bolton Valley Resort — Bolton Valley
 Bromley Mountain — Peru
 Burke Mountain — East Burke
 Cochran's Ski Area — Richmond
 Harrington Hill — Strafford
 Hard 'Ack — St. Albans
 Haystack Mountain —  Wilmington (private)
 Jay Peak Resort — Jay
 Killington Ski Resort — Killington
 Living Memorial Park — Brattleboro
 Lyndon Outing Club — Lyndon
 Mad River Glen — Fayston (ski only)
 Magic Mountain — Londonderry
 Middlebury College Snow Bowl — Hancock
 Mount Snow — West Dover
 Northeast Slopes — East Corinth
 Okemo Mountain — Ludlow
 Pico Mountain — Killington
 Plymouth Notch — Plymouth (private)
 Quechee Lakes Ski Area — Quechee (private)
 Saskadena Six — South Pomfret
 Smugglers' Notch — Jeffersonville
 Stowe Mountain Resort — Stowe
 Stratton Mountain Resort — Stratton Mountain
 Sugarbush Resort — Warren

Mid-Atlantic (51)

Maryland

 Wisp Ski Resort — McHenry

New Jersey

 Big Snow American Dream — East Rutherford (indoor)
 Campgaw Mountain — Mahwah
 Hidden Valley — Vernon
 Mountain Creek — Vernon

New York

 Beartown Ski Area — Plattsburgh
 Belleayre Ski Center — Highmount
 Big Tupper Ski Area — Tupper Lake
 Brantling Ski Slopes — Sodus
 Bristol Mountain Ski Resort — South Bristol
 Buffalo Ski Club — Colden
 Catamount Ski Area — Hillsdale
 Dry Hill Ski Area — Watertown
 Gore Mountain — North Creek
 Greek Peak — Virgil
 Hickory Ski Center — Warrensburg
 Holiday Valley — Ellicottville
 Holiday Mountain Ski & Fun — Monticello
 Holimont — Ellicottville
 Hunter Mountain — Hunter
 Kissing Bridge — Colden
 Labrador Mountain — Truxton
 Mount Peter Ski Area — Warwick
 McCauley Mountain — Old Forge
 Oak Mountain — Speculator
 Peek'n Peak — Clymer
 Plattekill Mountain — Roxbury
 Royal Mountain — Caroga
 Song Mountain Resort — Tully
 Snow Ridge Ski Resort — Turin
 Swain — Swain
 Sugar Hill — Sugar Hill
 Thunder Ridge Ski Area — Patterson
 Titus Mountain — Malone
 Toggenburg Mountain  — Fabius
 West Mountain — Glens Falls
 Willard Mountain — Greenwich
 Whiteface Mountain — Wilmington
 Windham Mountain — Windham
 Woods Valley Ski Resort — Westernville
 Victor Constant Ski Area - West Point

Pennsylvania
 Bear Creek Mountain Resort — Macungie
 Blue Knob All Seasons Resort — Claysburg
 Blue Mountain Resort — Palmerton
 Boyce Park — Plum
 Camelback Mountain Resort — Tannersville
 Eagle Rock Resort — Hazleton
 Elk Mountain — Union Dale
 Hidden Valley Four Seasons Resort — Hidden Valley
 Jack Frost Big Boulder — Blakeslee
 Laurel Mountain Ski Resort — Ligonier
 Liberty Mountain Resort — Carroll Valley
 Montage Mountain Ski Resort — Scranton
 Mountain View at Edinboro — Edinboro
 Seven Springs Mountain Resort — Seven Springs
 Shawnee Mountain Ski Area — East Stroudsburg
 Ski Big Bear — Lackawaxen
 Ski Denton — Coudersport
 Ski Roundtop — Lewisberry
 Spring Mountain — Schwenksville
 Ski Sawmill — Morris
 Tussey Mountain Ski Area — State College
 Whitetail Ski Resort — Mercersburg

Southeast (18)

Alabama

 Cloudmont Ski & Golf Resort — Mentone

North Carolina

 Appalachian Ski Mountain — Blowing Rock
 Cataloochee Ski Area — Maggie Valley
 Sapphire Valley — Sapphire
 Ski Beech — Beech Mountain
 Sugar Mountain — Sugar Mountain
 Wolf Ridge — Mars Hill

Tennessee

 Ober Gatlinburg — Gatlinburg

Texas

 Mount Aggie Ski Slope — College Station

Virginia

 Bryce Resort — Basye-Bryce Mountain
 Massanutten Ski Resort — Massanutten
 The Homestead — Hot Springs
 Wintergreen Resort — Wintergreen

West Virginia

 Canaan Valley Resort — Davis
 Oglebay Resort — Wheeling
 Snowshoe Mountain — Snowshoe
 Timberline Four Seasons Resort — Davis
 Winterplace — Ghent

Midwest (116)

Illinois

 Chestnut Mountain Resort — Galena
 Ski Four Lakes — Lisle
 Raging Buffalo Snowboard Park — Algonquin
 Ski Snowstar — Andalusia
 Villa Olivia — Bartlett

Indiana

 Paoli Peaks — Paoli
 Perfect North Slopes — Lawrenceburg

Iowa

 Mt. Crescent Ski Area — Crescent
 Seven Oaks Snow Ski Area — Boone
 Sleepy Hollow Sports Park — Des Moines
 Sundown Mountain — Dubuque

Michigan

 Alpine Valley — White Lake
 Big Powderhorn Mountain — Bessemer
 Bittersweet Ski Resort — Otsego
 Blackjack Ski Resort — Bessemer
 Boyne Mountain Resort — Boyne Falls
 Caberfae Peaks Ski & Golf Resort — Cadillac
 Cannonsburg Ski Area — Cannonsburg
 Challenge Mountain — Boyne City
 Crystal Mountain Resort & Spa — Thompsonville
 Hickory Hills Ski Area — Traverse City
 The Highlands at Harbor Springs — Harbor Springs
 The Homestead — Glen Arbor
 Indianhead Mountain Resort — Wakefield
 Marquette Mountain — Marquette
 Mont Ripley Ski Resort — Houghton
 Mount Bohemia — Lac La Belle
 Mt. Brighton Ski Resort — Brighton
 Mt. Holiday — Traverse City
 Mt. Holly Ski and Snowboard Resort — Holly
 Mt. McSauba Recreation Area — Charlevoix
 Mt. Zion Ski Area — Ironwood
 Mulligan's Hollow Ski Bowl — Grand Haven
 Norway Mountain Ski and Snowboard Resort — Norway
 Nub's Nob — Harbor Springs
 Otsego Club & Resort — Gaylord
 Petoskey Winter Sports Park — Petoskey
 Pine Knob Ski Resort — Clarkston
 Pine Mountain Resort — Iron Mountain
 Porcupine Mountains Ski Area — Silver City
 Shanty Creek Resorts — Bellaire
 Ski Brule — Iron River
 Snow Snake Ski & Golf — Harrison
 Swiss Valley Ski and Snowboard Area — Jones
 Timber Ridge Ski Area — Gobles
 Treetops Resort — Gaylord

Minnesota
 Afton Alps — Afton
 Andes Tower Hills — Kensington
 Buck Hill — Burnsville
 Buena Vista Ski Area — Bemidji
 Chester Bowl Park — Duluth
 Coffee Mill Ski Area — Wabasha
 Detroit Mountain — Detroit Lakes
 Giants Ridge — Biwabik
 Hyland Ski and Snowboard Area — Bloomington
 Lutsen Mountains — Lutsen
 Mount Itasca — Coleraine
 Mount Kato — Mankato
 Powder Ridge — Kimball
 Ski Gull — Nisswa
 Spirit Mountain — Duluth
 Welch Village — Welch
 Wild Mountain — Taylors Falls

Missouri

 Hidden Valley Ski Area — Wildwood
 Snow Creek — Weston

North Dakota

 Bottineau Winter Park — Bottineau
 Frost Fire — Walhalla
 Huff Hills — Huff

Ohio

 Alpine Valley Ski Area — Chesterland
 Big Creek Ski Area — Concord
 Boston Mills/Brandywine Ski Resort — Peninsula
 Mad River Mountain — Bellefontaine
 Snow Trails Ski Resort — Mansfield

South Dakota

 Mystic Miner Ski Resort — Lead
 Great Bear Recreation Park — Sioux Falls
 Terry Peak Ski Area — Lead

Wisconsin

 Alpine Valley Resort — East Troy
 Ausblick Ski Club — Sussex (private)
 Badlands Sno-Park — Hudson
 Book Across the Bay — Ashland
 Blackhawk Ski Club — Middleton (private)
 Bruce Mound Winter Sports Area — Merrillan
 Camp 10 — Rhinelander
 Cascade Mountain — Portage
 Christie Mountain — Bruce
 Christmas Mountain Village — Wisconsin Dells
 Crystal Ridge — Franklin
 Devils Head Resort — Baraboo
 Fox Hill Ski Area — West Bend (private)
 Granite Peak — Wausau
 Heiliger Huegel Ski Club — Hubertus (private)
 Kettlebowl — Bryant
 Kewaunee County Winter Park Ski Hill — Kewaunee County, Wisconsin § Parks and other lands open to the public
 Keyes Peak — Florence
 Little Switzerland Ski Area — Slinger
 Mont Du Lac — Superior
 The Mountain Top at Grand Geneva Resort — Lake Geneva
 Mt. Ashwabay — Bayfield
 Mt. LaCrosse — LaCrosse
 Navarino Slopes — Navarino
 Nordic Mountain — Mount Morris
 Nutt Hill — Plymouth
 Powers Bluff — Arpin
 Standing Rocks — Stevens Point
 Sunburst Ski Area — Kewaskum
 Telemark Lodge — Cable
 Triangle Sports Area — Green Bay
 Trollhaugen — Dresser
 Tyrol Basin — Mount Horeb
 Whitecap Mountains — Montreal
 Whitetail Ridge — Fort McCoy
 Wilmot Mountain — Wilmot

Rocky Mountains (98)

Arizona

 Arizona Snowbowl — Flagstaff
 Elk Ridge Ski Area — Williams
 Mount Lemmon Ski Valley — Summerhaven
 Sunrise Park Resort — Greer

Colorado

 Arapahoe Basin — Keystone
 Aspen/Snowmass — Aspen and Snowmass Village
 Aspen Highlands
 Aspen Mountain
 Buttermilk
 Snowmass
 Beaver Creek Resort — Beaver Creek
 Breckenridge Ski Resort — Breckenridge
 Chapman Hill Ski Area — Durango
 Copper Mountain Resort — Copper Mountain
 Cranor Ski Area — Gunnison
 Crested Butte Mountain Resort — Mount Crested Butte
 Echo Mountain Resort — Evergreen
 Eldora Mountain Resort — Eldora
 Hesperus Ski Area — Hesperus
 Howelsen Hill Ski Area — Steamboat Springs
 Kendall Mountain Ski Area — Silverton
 Keystone Resort — Keystone
 Lake City Ski Hill — Lake City
 Loveland Ski Area — Georgetown
 Loveland Valley
 Monarch Ski Area — Salida
 Otter Mountain — Georgetown
 Powderhorn Resort — Mesa
 Purgatory Resort — Durango
 Silverton Mountain — Silverton
 Ski Cooper — Leadville
 Ski Granby Ranch — Granby
 Steamboat Ski Resort — Steamboat Springs
 Sunlight Ski Area — Glenwood Springs
 Telluride Ski Resort — Telluride
 Vail Ski Resort — Vail
 Winter Park Resort — Winter Park
 Wolf Creek ski area — Pagosa Springs

Idaho

 Bald Mountain — Pierce
 Bogus Basin — Boise
 Brundage Mountain — McCall
 Cottonwood Butte — Cottonwood
 Kelly Canyon — Ririe
 Little Ski Hill — McCall
 Lookout Pass — Mullan
 Lost Trail Powder Mountain — North Fork
 Magic Mountain — Hansen
 Pebble Creek — Inkom
 Pine Street Ski Area -- Sandpoint
 Pomerelle — Albion
 Rotarun — Hailey
 Schweitzer Mountain — Sandpoint
 Silver Mountain — Kellogg
 Snowhaven — Grangeville
 Soldier Mountain — Fairfield
 Sun Valley — Ketchum
 Tamarack — Donnelly

Montana

 Bear Paw Ski Bowl - Havre
 Big Sky — Big Sky
 Blacktail Mountain — Lakeside
 Bridger Bowl — Bozeman
 Discovery — Anaconda
 Great Divide — Marysville
 Lost Trail Powder Mountain — Conner
 Maverick Mountain — Polaris
 Montana Snowbowl — Missoula
 Moonlight Basin — Big Sky
 Red Lodge Mountain — Red Lodge
 Showdown — Neihart
 Teton Pass — Choteau
 Turner Mountain — Libby
 Whitefish Mountain Resort — Whitefish
 Yellowstone Club — Big Sky (private)

New Mexico

 Angel Fire Resort — Angel Fire
 Pajarito Mountain — Los Alamos
 Red River Ski Area — Red River
 Sandia Peak — Albuquerque
 Sipapu — Vadito
 Ski Apache — Ruidoso
 Ski Cloudcroft — Cloudcroft
 Ski Santa Fe — Santa Fe
 Taos Ski Valley — Taos

Utah

 Alta — Alta  (ski only)
 Beaver Mountain — Logan Canyon
 Brian Head — Brian Head
 Brighton — Big Cottonwood Canyon
 Cherry Peak Resort — Richmond
 Deer Valley — Park City (ski only)
 Eagle Point Ski Resort — Beaver
 Nordic Valley — Eden
 Park City Mountain Resort — Park City
 Powder Mountain — Eden
 Snowbasin — Huntsville
 Snowbird — Snowbird
 Solitude — Big Cottonwood Canyon
 Sundance — Provo
 Woodward Park City — Park City

Wyoming

 Antelope Butte Mountain Recreational Area — Shell
 Beartooth Basin Summer Ski Area — via Red Lodge
 Grand Targhee — Alta
 Hogadon — Casper
 Jackson Hole — Teton Village
 Meadowlark Ski Lodge — Ten Sleep
 Pine Creek — Cokeville
 Sleeping Giant Ski Area & Zipline — Cody
 Snow King Mountain — Jackson
 Snowy Range — Centennial
 White Pine — Pinedale

West Coast (70)

Alaska

 Arctic Valley — Anchorage
 Alyeska — Girdwood
 Eaglecrest — Juneau
 Hilltop — Anchorage
 Majestic Heli Ski — Glacier View
 Moose Mountain — Fairbanks
 Mount Eyak — Cordova
 Ski Land — Fairbanks

California

 Alpine Meadows — Alpine Meadows
 Alta Sierra — Wofford Heights
 Badger Pass — Yosemite National Park
 Bear Mountain — Big Bear Lake
 Bear Valley — Angels Camp
 Boreal Mountain — Soda Springs
 Buckhorn Ski Club — Three Points (private)
 China Peak — Lakeshore
 Coppervale Ski Area — Susanville 
 Dodge Ridge — Sonora
 Donner Ski Ranch — Norden
 Granlibakken — Tahoe City
 Heavenly Mountain — South Lake Tahoe
 Homewood Mountain — Homewood
 June Mountain — June Lake
 Kirkwood Mountain — Kirkwood
 Mammoth Mountain — Mammoth Lakes
 Mount Baldy Ski Lifts — Mount Baldy
 Mount Shasta Ski Park — Mount Shasta
 Mount Waterman — Three Points
 Mountain High — Wrightwood
 Northstar California — Truckee
 Sierra-at-Tahoe — Twin Bridges
 Snow Summit — Big Bear Lake
 Snow Valley — Running Springs
 Soda Springs — Soda Springs
 Squaw Valley — Olympic Valley
 Sugar Bowl — Norden
 Tahoe Donner Downhill — Truckee

Nevada

 Diamond Peak — Incline Village
 Elko Snobowl Ski and Bike Park — Elko
 Las Vegas Ski and Snowboard Resort (Lee Canyon) — Las Vegas
 Mount Rose — Reno
 Sky Tavern Ski Area — Reno

Oregon

 Anthony Lakes — North Powder
 Cooper Spur — Parkdale
 Ferguson Ridge — Joseph
 Hoodoo — Sisters
 Mount Ashland — Ashland
 Mount Bachelor — Bend
 Mount Hood Meadows — Government Camp
 Mount Hood Skibowl — Government Camp
 Timberline Lodge — Government Camp
 Summit Pass
 Warner Canyon — Lakeview
 Willamette Pass — Odell Lake

Washington

 49 Degrees North — Chewelah
 Badger Mountain — Waterville
 Crystal Mountain — near Enumclaw
 Echo Valley — Chelan
 Hurricane Ridge — near Port Angeles
 Leavenworth Ski Hill — Leavenworth
 Loup Loup Ski Bowl — near Twisp
 Meany Lodge — Stampede Pass (private)
 Mission Ridge — near Wenatchee
 Mt. Baker — Glacier
 Mount Spokane — near Spokane
 Sahalie Ski Club — Snoqualmie Pass (private)
 Sitzmark Ski Area — Tonasket
 Ski Bluewood — near Dayton
 Stevens Pass — Stevens Pass
 The Summit at Snoqualmie — Snoqualmie Pass
 Alpental
 Summit Central
 Summit East
 Summit West
 White Pass — White Pass

See also
 Comparison of North American ski resorts
 List of ski areas and resorts
 List of ski areas and resorts in Canada
 List of tourist attractions worldwide

References

External links
White Book of ski areas directory
Ski areas per state (NSAA)

 
United States
Ski areas and resorts
Ski areas